Pultenaea dentata, commonly known as clustered bush-pea, is a species of flowering plant in the family Fabaceae and is endemic to south-eastern Australia. It is an erect to low-lying or prostrate, open shrub with elliptic to narrow egg-shaped leaves and dense clusters of yellow, red and purple flowers.

Description
The flowers are densely clustered in groups of more than six on the ends of the branchlets, with dark brown, egg-shaped bracts. The standard petal is bright yellow with red markings, the wings are yellow and the keel is purple with a yellow base. Flowering occurs from October to December and the fruit is a flattened, egg-shaped pod.

Taxonomy and naming
Pultenaea dentata was first formally described in 1805 by Jacques Labillardière in Novae Hollandiae Plantarum Specimen. The specific epithet (densifolia) means "toothed".

Distribution and habitat
This pultenaea grows in swampy heath or on the edges of streams in south-eastern, Queensland, on the coast and tablelands of New South Wales, southern Victoria, south-eastern South Australia and in Tasmania where it is widespread and common.

References

dentata
Fabales of Australia
Flora of South Australia
Flora of Victoria (Australia)
Flora of New South Wales
Flora of Queensland
Flora of Tasmania
Taxa named by Jacques Labillardière
Plants described in 1805